Amalia Calzavara (born 2 April 1966) is an Italian sprint canoeist who competed in the early 1990s. She was eliminated in the semifinals of K-4 500 m event at the 1992 Summer Olympics in Barcelona.

References
Sports-Reference.com profile

External links

1966 births
Canoeists at the 1992 Summer Olympics
Italian female canoeists
Living people
Olympic canoeists of Italy
Place of birth missing (living people)